Warning, Advice and Reporting Point (WARP) is a community or internal company-based service to share advice and information on computer-based threats and vulnerabilities.

WARPs typically provide:
 Warning - A filtered warning service, where subscribers receive alerts and advisory information on only the subjects relevant to them.
 Advice - An advice brokering service, where members can ask and respond to questions in a trusted secure environment.
 Reporting - Central collection of information on incidents and problems in a trusted secure environment. The collected information may then be anonymised and shared amongst the membership.

On average, WARPs cost much less to set up than a Computer Emergency Response Centre, as in CERT/CC or US-CERT.

See also
 Information security management system
 British cyber security community

External links
 UK WARP Official homepage with downloadable toolbox

Computer security organizations